Tábata Vitorino de Carvalho (born 23 April 1996) is a Brazilian athlete. She competed in the mixed 4 × 400 metres relay event at the 2020 Summer Olympics.

Personal bests
400 m: 51.99 –  Rio de Janeiro, 23 Jun 2022

References

External links
 

1996 births
Living people
Brazilian female sprinters
Athletes (track and field) at the 2020 Summer Olympics
Olympic athletes of Brazil
People from Maringá
Sportspeople from Paraná (state)
21st-century Brazilian women